John Higginson may refer to:

John Higginson (fellow) (fl. 1561–1622), founding fellow of Jesus College, Oxford and clergyman
John Higginson (entrepreneur) (1839–1904), Anglo-Irish born Frenchman, miner, entrepreneur and adventurer who founded the Caledonian Company of the New Hebrides to colonise Vanuatu
John Higginson (minister) (1616–1708), English-born Massachusetts Puritan clergyman
John Higginson, actor in High Road to China

See also 
 Jack Higginson (disambiguation)